Kinaesthetics (or kinesthetics, in American English) is the study of body motion, and of the perception (both conscious and unconscious) of one's own body motions. Kinesthesis is the learning of movements that an individual commonly performs. The individual must repeat the motions that they are trying to learn and perfect many times for this to happen. While kinesthesis may be described as "muscle memory", muscles do not store memory; rather, it is the proprioceptors giving the information from muscles to brain. To do this, the individual must have a sense of the position of their body and how that changes throughout the motor skill they are trying to perform. While performing the motion the body will use receptors in the muscles to transfer information to the brain to tell the brain about what the body is doing. Then after completing the same motor skill numerous times, the brain will begin to remember the motion based on the position of the body at a given time. Then after learning the motion the body will be able perform the motor skill even when usual senses are inhibited, such as the person closing their eyes. The body will perform the motion based on the information that is stored in the brain from previous attempts at the same movement. This is possible because the brain has formed connections between the location of body parts in space (the body uses perception to learn where their body is in space) and the subsequent movements that commonly follow these positions. It becomes almost an instinct. The person does not need to even think about what they are doing to perfect the skill; they have done it so many times that it feels effortless and requires little to no thought. When the kinesthetic system has learned a motor skill proficiently, it will be able to work even when one's vision is limited. The perception of continuous movement (kinesthesia) is largely unconscious. A conscious proprioception is achieved through increased awareness. Kinaesthetics involves the teaching and personal development of such awareness.

Therapeutic applications
Occupational therapy and physical therapy based on movement-associated awareness has been applied in the Western world since the mid-1980s, especially in Central European care facilities. It makes use of the psychophysiological finding that greater muscle tone reduces proprioceptive sensitivity. Kinaesthetics may benefit patients who need:
Assistance in activities of daily living (ADL)
Somatic feedback
To reduce the physical effort required to move

Daily Life applications
The kinesthetic system is important with performing many motor skills, one being driving a car. If the body could not instantly remember what to do, driving would be very dangerous. When first starting to drive, all new drivers lack this ability to quickly respond because they have never been in situations like this before. The more they drive and are faced with similar situations, the more they get used to how to react and the more it becomes an instinct. By everyone knowing what they are doing when it comes to turning and stopping, it makes driving on the road safer. People can focus on what is in front of them in case their environment suddenly changes instead of focusing on how to turn the wheel or press on the brakes.

History
Kinaesthetics was developed in the early 1970s by Frank White Hatch, who was a choreographer and dancer. Hatch studied behavioral cybernetics at Madison/Wisconsin and developed academic programs for movement and dance called Kinaesthetics in three American universities. He then turned to working with disabled children as well as the field of rehabilitation. Psychologist Lenny Maietta (1950-2018) developed a handling training program for young parents that was also based on behavioral cybernetics. Hatch and Maietta taught and worked together in German-speaking countries beginning in 1974. With the dancer John Graham, they held workshops under the name of Gentle Dance.

Maietta and Hatch used Kinaesthetics seminars the first time as therapy in the Ernest-Holmes Fachklinik in Germany 1974–77. Together with registered nurse Suzanne Bernard Schmidt, Maietta and Hatch developed a job-specific program "Kinaesthetics in Nursing." They were in dialogue and exchange with Gregory Bateson, Moshe Feldenkrais, Berta and Karel Bobath, Liliane Juchli, and Nancy Roper. In addition to behavioral cybernetics and dance, movement therapy and humanistic psychology were named as key sources of kinaesthetics.

Maietta and Hatch are still actively involved in the development of Kinaesthetics. In the last years, programs for caregivers, for workplace health and for older people especially were developed. Currently there are four organizations in which Kinaesthetics programs are developed.

Literature

Films
 Asmussen-Clausen, M. / Knobel, S. (2006): Fortbewegen statt heben - Kinästhetik in der Pflegepraxis (DVD)
 Asmussen-Clausen, M. / Buschmann, U. (2004): Kinästhetik Infant Handling - Bewegungsunterstützung in den ersten Lebensjahren (DVD)
 Bauder-Mißbach, H. (2008): "Grundlagen der Bewegungsförderung " (DVD)
 Marty-Teuber, M. (2000): Ermöglichen statt Behindern - Kinaesthetics ein Lern- und Interaktionsmodell (DVD)

References

Further reading

 Achinger, R.; Steenebrügge, A.: Projekt Präoperative Anleitung. In: Pflegezeitschrift 10/2002 (Retrieved 23. July 2012)
 Buge, R.; Mahler, C. (2004): Evaluationsbericht Auswertung der Befragung zum Kinästhetikprojekt. Universitätsklinikum Heidelberg (Retrieved 12. November 2011)
 Citon, I.: Kinästhetik im OP – Geht das? In: Im OP. Fachzeitschrift für OP-Pflege und OTA. Stuttgart: Georg Tieme Verlag 2011, Heft 2: S. 67-72 (Retrieved 24. August 2012)
 Collection of contributions of Kinaesthetics-coaches at Journal Viv-Arte® Kinästhetik-Plus (Retrieved 24. August 2012)
 Freiberg, A.; Girbig, M.; Euler, U.; Scharfe J.; Nienhaus, A.; Freitag, S., Seidler, A. (2016). Influence of the Kinaesthetics care conception during patient handling on the development of musculoskeletal complaints and diseases – A scoping review. Journal of Occupational Medicine and Toxicology, 11(1), 24. (Retrieved 22. November 2017)
 Hantikainen, V.: Beeinflusst die Kinaesthetics Schulung die körperliche Belastung von Pflegekräften? (Retrieved 12. Juli 2012)
 Maietta, L.: Ein Gesundheits-Entwicklungsprogramm mit dem Ziel gesunde, produktive und innovative Mitarbeiter auszubilden. (Retrieved 22. November 2011)
 Maietta, L.; Resch-Kroell, U. (2009): MH-Kinaesthetics fördert Gesundheit der Mitarbeiter. In: Die Schwester Der Pfleger 48. Jg., Heft 4. (Retrieved 12. Juli 2012)
 Selection of online-articles of the Kinaesthetics-periodical Lebensqualität. Fachzeitschrift für Kinaesthetics und Lebensqualität. (Retrieved 24. August 2012)
 Mora, A.: MH Kinaesthetics in der Geburtsarbeit. In: Deutscher Hebammenverband: Geburtsarbeit. Hebammenwissen zur Unterstützung der physiologischen Geburt. Stuttgart: Hippokrates Verlag 2010, S. 138-154.  (Zugriff: 23. September 2012)
 Proske, U.; Gandevia, S. C.: The kinaesthetic senses. Topical Review. Journal of Physiology 587.17 (2009) pp. 4139-4146 (Zugriff: 18. September 2012)
 Rosker, J.; Sarabon, N. (2010): Kinaesthesia and Methods for its Assessment. Literature Review. In: Sport Science Review. Band XIX, Heft 5-6, Seiten 165–208 (Zugriff: 30. Jänner 2013)
 Schlegel, R.: Kinaesthetics in der Palliative Care. In: palliative-ch. Zeitschrift der Schweizerischen Gesellschaft für Palliative Medizin, Pflege und Begleitung. Nr. 3/2011 S. 9-13. (Zugriff: 23. Jänner 2013)
 Videos / Fernsehbeiträge / DVDs über die Kinästhetik (organized by topic) (Zugriff: 4. September 2012)
 Yamamoto, N. et al. (2007). The comparison of EMG activities between Kinaesthetics and normal methods during patient-handling tasks in health care workers. Journal of Biomechanics 40; p. 655. Retrieved 17. November 2017

Physical therapy
Proprioception
Rehabilitation medicine
Sports medicine